McKusick–Kaufman syndrome is a genetic condition associated with MKKS.

The condition is named for Dr. Robert L. Kaufman and Victor McKusick. It is sometimes known by the abbreviation MKS. In infancy it can be difficult to distinguish between MKS and the related Bardet–Biedl syndrome, as the more severe symptoms of the latter condition rarely materialise before adulthood.

McKusick-Kaufman syndrome affects 1 in 10,000 people in the Old Order Amish population. Research has not identified cases outside of this population.

Presentation
Clinically, McKusick–Kaufman syndrome is characterized by a combination of three features: postaxial polydactyly, heart defects, and genital abnormalities:
 Vaginal atresia with hydrometrocolpos
 Double vagina and/or uterus.
 Hypospadias, chordee (a downward-curving penis), and undescended testes (cryptorchidism).
 ureter stenosis or ureteric atresia

Genetics 
MKS is inherited in an autosomal recessive dominance pattern. Both parents of the affected must be heterozygous carriers of the pathogenic variant. Heterozygous carriers for MKS show no symptoms of the disorder, nor can they develop the disorder. Each child of these carriers has a 1/4 chance of being affected by MKS, a 1/2 chance of being carriers themselves, and a 1/4 chance of being unaffected and a non carrier.

Diagnosis
Clinical findings support the diagnosis of MKS, including identification of biallelic pathogenetic variants. Diagnosis additionally requires ruling out Bardet-Biedl Syndrome.

Treatment
Treatments are available for accompanying symptoms of MKS, including addressing polydactyly and congenital heart defects.

See also
 Bardet–Biedl syndrome
 Dominance (genetics)

References

External links 

 GeneReview/NIH/UW entry on McKusick–Kaufman Syndrome

Ciliopathy
Syndromes in females
Syndromes with dysmelia
Syndromes affecting the heart